Coleophora marcella is a moth of the family Coleophoridae that is endemic to Uzbekistan.

References

External links

marcella
Moths described in 1972
Moths of Asia
Endemic fauna of Uzbekistan